Rani Padmini is a 2015 is an Indian Malayalam film directed by Aashiq Abu, starring Manju Warrier and Rima Kallingal in the lead. Produced by the company Fort Entertainment. The script was written by Syam Pushkaran and Ravisankar (script writer and Director). The music score was composed by Bijibal. It is a portrayal of the journey towards the amative awakening of two women from different backgrounds with a blend of feminism. The film pays homage to Narendra Prasad. The film was released on 23 October 2015.

Plot
Padmini (Manju Warrier), a traditional married woman, goes to Manali, Himachal Pradesh to meet her car rallying driver husband Giri (Jinu Joseph) to resolve a personal conflict. Rani, (Rima Kallingal) is a tomboy brought up in North India. She is running away from a wanted criminal Raja who has posed a threat to her life. Rani and Padmini meet on a bus and a memorable journey starts with the pleasantness of simple interpersonal relations. Together they try to find Giri while simultaneously trying to evade capture by Raja's gang.

Cast
Manju Warrier as Padmini
Rima Kallingal as Rani
Jinu Joseph as Giri
Sajitha Madathil as Lalithamma
Dileesh Pothan as Ullas Menon
Sreenath Bhasi as Trekker
 Sandeep Narayanan as Hulk
Soubin Shahir as Madan
Sooraj Harris as Sharukh Khan
Binu Pappu as Kareem
Kunchan as Shankaran Vaidyar
Ambika Mohan as Padmini's mother
Srinda Ashab as Nandhini
Sana Althaf as Trekker 
Ivana
Vivek Bhaskar as Rana Sherghill
Subbalakshmi as Rani's grandmother/Suresh

Production
The official launch of the film was held at a function in Kochi on 14 April 2015. Filmmakers Lal Jose, Anwar Rasheed and Sameer Thahir were present at the function along with actors Shekhar Menon, Sana Althaf, Maqbool Salmaan and Siddique. Talking about the subject in an interview, Actress Manju said that, many would consider it as a women's empowerment movie with two female in the lead, it is not. "It is a visual treat with a lot of humor in a feminine tone and celebration of all-rounder aspect of women's capability, who can care, comfort and in even dire situations be a guiding force".

Apart from Kerala, the film was shot extensively in Kashmir Valley, Himachal Pradesh and Delhi. The first look poster was released on 23 July. The first official trailer released on 9 October.

Critical reception
Veeyen of Nowrunning.com wrote that "Aashiq Abu's go-girl tour-de-force is syrupy without ever being saccharine and tugging without ever being overwhelming. It's a film with the actress' proofed script for re-entry and strengthening of yesteryear female leads in Mollywood. It is intriguing with retrospection, and bolstered by a sharp planning and a helms a scrupulous director that can strike chords of the heart." Paresh C Palicha of Rediff.com stated that the film is an entertainer, and that "director Aashiq Abu takes up the gamble of making a film with no male superstar."

Box office
The film collected  on its first day of release and collected 1.66 crore within 4 days. It grossed  in 14 days.

Music

The songs were released by the music label Muzik 247 on 14 October. Featuring four tracks, the music was composed by Bijibal with lyrics written by Rafeeq Ahammed and Nellai Jayantha ("Puthu Puthu").

The first video song titled "Varu Pokaam Parakkaam" was released on 28 September. The song features childhood of Rani and Padmini.

Awards
Vanitha Film Awards
Special Performance (female) - Rima Kallingal
5th South Indian International Movie Awards
Nominated - Best Actress in a Supporting Role - Rima Kallingal
Nominated - Best Music Director - Bijipal
63rd Filmfare Awards South
Nominated - Best Actress - Manju Warrier
Nominated - Best Playback Singer Female - Chitra Arun - "Oru Makaranilavay"
Asianet Film Awards
Best Actress - Manju Warrier - Nominated (shared with Ennum Eppozhum)
Best Character Actress - Rima Kallingal - Nominated

References

External links
 
 

Indian road movies
2010s Malayalam-language films
2010s road movies
Films set in Himachal Pradesh
Films shot in Himachal Pradesh
Films shot in Delhi
Films shot in Jammu and Kashmir
Indian feminist films
Indian chase films
Indian female buddy films
2015 films
Indian adventure films
Climbing films
2010s adventure films
Films with screenplays by Syam Pushkaran
Films about women in India
Films set in Manali, Himachal Pradesh
Films directed by Aashiq Abu